The Atal Bihari Vajpayee Traffic and Transit Management Center (Atal Bihari Vajpayee TTMC) is a bus station in Shantinagara, Bengaluru, Karnataka, India. Long distance buses of KSRTC, TNSTC and SETC  buses bound towards Tamil Nadu and KSRTC and APSRTC buses towards Andhra Pradesh depart from this bus station. It is also a transit for BMTC buses.

Location 
The bus station is located on Kengal Hanumantaiah Road, next to the central offices of the Bengaluru Metropolitan Transport Corporation and Karnataka State Road Transport Corporation. The Depot #1 of BMTC was remodelled as a bus station with four bays.

Layout 
The first bay is for BMTC buses going towards Jayanagar, Koramangla, J.P.Nagar, Bannerghatta Road and Hosur Road.  The second bay is for all buses going towards Shivajinagar, Kempegowda Bus Station, K.R. Puram(G-12) and Kengeri(G-6). The third bay is for all buses towards Andhra Pradesh (Tirupati, Hyderabad, Vijayawada) etc.  The Fourth bay is for all Tamil Nadu bound buses. There is also an air-conditioned lounge for passengers waiting for a bus to the Bengaluru International Airport.

Connectivity 
This place is well connected to Majestic, Shivajinagar, Koramangala, Hosur Road, Sarjapura Road, Bannerghatta Road, Jayanagara, Banashankari, Carmelaram Railway station and Mysuru Road.

See also 
 Bangalore Metropolitan Transport Corporation
 Karnataka State Road Transport Corporation

References 

Buildings and structures in Bangalore
Transport in Bangalore
Bus stations in Karnataka